François Blanc, a majority stockholder and operator of the Monte Carlo Casino.

François Blanc may also refer to:

 François blanc (grape variety), a white French wine grape variety

See also
Francis White (disambiguation)
Francis Blanche, French actor